Lish is a village in Iran. Lish may also refer to:

People
 Atticus Lish (born 1972), American novelist
 Gordon Lish (born 1934), American writer
 Ira M. Lish (1855–1937), American politician and businessman
 Issa Lish (born 1995), Mexican fashion model
 Lish McBride, American writer

Other topics
 Lish language, a language spoken in Arunachal Pradesh, India
 LisH domain, a protein domain

See also
 McLish, a surname